There are two rivers named São Sebastião River in Brazil:

 São Sebastião River (Espírito Santo)
 São Sebastião River (Paraná)

See also
 São Sebastião (disambiguation)